Virbia fluminea is a moth in the family Erebidae. It was described by William Schaus in 1912. It is found in Costa Rica.

References

Moths described in 1912
fluminea